The Biblián Formation is an Early Miocene (Colhuehuapian in the SALMA classification) geologic formation of the Cuenca Basin in Ecuador. Fossils of Xenastrapotherium aequatorialis have been found in the formation.

See also 
 List of fossiliferous stratigraphic units in Ecuador

References

Further reading 
 S. E. Johnson and R. H. Madden. 1997. Uruguaytheriine Astrapotheres of Tropical South America. In R. F. Kay, R. H. Madden, R. L. Cifelli, J. J. Flynn (eds.), Vertebrate Paleontology in the Neotropics. The Miocene fauna of La Venta, Colombia 355-382

Geologic formations of Ecuador
Miocene Series of South America
Neogene Ecuador
Burdigalian
Colhuehuapian
Paleontology in Ecuador
Formations